Garciaparra is a surname. Notable people with the surname include:

Mia Hamm-Garciaparra (born 1972), American soccer player and wife of Nomar
Michael Garciaparra (born 1983), American baseball player
Nomar Garciaparra (born 1973), American baseball player

See also
García (surname)